Division No. 5 (Southwestern area) is a census division located within the Westman Region in the south west area of the province of Manitoba, Canada. Unlike in some other provinces, census divisions do not reflect the organization of local government in Manitoba. These areas exist solely for the purposes of statistical analysis and presentation; they have no government of their own.

The major industry of Westman is agriculture. However, there is also some oil production in the southwest area of the region.

Demographics 

Towns

Melita

Unincorporated Urban Communities

Boissevain
Deloraine
Hartney
Killarney
Waskada

Rural municipalities

Boissevain – Morton
Brenda – Waskada
Deloraine – Winchester
Grassland
Killarney – Turtle Mountain
Prairie Lakes
Two Borders

Former rural municipalities
Albert (amalgamated with the RMs of Arthur and Edward in 2015)
Arthur (amalgamated with the RMs of Albert and Edward in 2015)
Brenda (amalgamated with the Village of Waskada in 2015)
Cameron (amalgamated with the Town of Hartney and RM of Whitewater in 2015)
Edward (amalgamated with the RMs of Albert and Arthur in 2015)
Turtle Mountain (amalgamated with the Town of Killarney in 2007)
Morton (amalgamated with the Town of Boissevain in 2015)
Riverside (amalgamated with the RM of Strathcona in 2015)
Strathcona (amalgamated with the RM of Riverside in 2015)
Whitewater (amalgamated with the Town of Hartney and RM of Cameron in 2015)
Winchester (amalgamated with the Town of Deloraine in 2015)

References

Community Profile: Census Division No. 5, Manitoba; Statistics Canada

External links
Manitoba Regional Profiles: Westman Region

05